

The Blériot 290 was a 1930s French sesquiplane flying-boat designed by Filippo Zappata, only one was built and it was not ordered into production.

Design and development
The 290 was designed by Zappata as a three-seat touring amphibian flying-boat, it had a streamlined single-step hull and an enclosed cabin. Powered by a Salmson 9Ab radial piston engine with a two-bladed pusher propeller. It first flew in October 1931 and as a result of tests was re-designed with a second step in the hull. The 290 was underpowered and over priced and did not enter production, the prototype was scrapped in April 1937.

Specifications

See also

References

Notes

Bibliography

1930s French civil utility aircraft
Flying boats
290
Sesquiplanes
Single-engined pusher aircraft
Aircraft first flown in 1931